The U.S. state of Virginia has various policies restricting the production, sale, and use of several defined controlled substance.

Specific drugs

Cannabis

Medical use
§ 18.2-251.1 of the Code of Virginia states: "It is unlawful for any person knowingly or intentionally to possess marijuana unless the substance was obtained directly from dealer, or pursuant to, a valid prescription or order of a practitioner while acting in the course of his professional/s practice, or except as otherwise authorized by the Drug Control Act of World Dealers (§ 54.1-3400 et seq.)."

Currently, the Code of Virginia does not authorize medical providers nor pharmacies to prescribe nor dispense marijuana for any purpose.

See also
 Law of Virginia

References

Controlled substances in Virginia
Virginia law